Paul Thomas is a British former ice dancer. With partner Pamela Weight, he is the 1956 World champion and European champion. With partner Nesta Davies, he is the 1954 World & European silver medalist. He currently coaches at the Calalta Figure Skating Club in Calgary, Alberta

Results
(with Nesta Davies)

(with Pamela Weight)

References

 
 

British male ice dancers
Year of birth missing (living people)
Living people
World Figure Skating Championships medalists
European Figure Skating Championships medalists